The Little Panda Fighter (previously titled Heavy's Little Bear) is a 2008 Brazilian computer-animated sports action comedy film directed by Michelle Gabriel. The film has drawn criticism as a mockbuster of the DreamWorks Animation film Kung Fu Panda.

Plot
In a small town inhabited by anthropomorphic bears, a giant panda named Pancada works at a boxing club called Bear Bar Box, as their janitor. He has dreams of one day becoming a professional dancer, despite everyone's indifference, and is in love with a brown bear waitress named Honey. His boss, a polar bear named Polaris, finds that his club isn't fairing too well, mostly due to his amazing fighter, Freak Teddy, winning all the fights he's in. Despite wanting to go in and defeat Teddy himself, the property's manager, Grizzlepuss, informs Polaris that he is under contract to not to.

Later that night, Pancada visits his dancing instructor, a small brown bear named Master Jin, who teaches him about loyalty. The following day, Polaris has found his old fighting costume- a two-piece black top, bottom and face mask- and tells Pancada to wash it for him, after they discover it smells really vile. After Polaris tells Pancada his plan to secretly fight Freak Teddy in disguise, the latter leaves, attempting to keep a cool demeanor. In the basement washroom, Pancada becomes distracted to the rhythm of the washer, resulting in the costume shrinking in the wash.

The day of the fight, Polaris, in disguise, begins the fight with Freak Teddy, while Pancada goes to a dance competition. At the fight, the costume Polaris is wearing shrinks on him, causing him to look like a Panda Bear. This leads Grizzlepuss and Honey to mistake Polaris as Pancada. Despite this, he wins, while Pancada wins the dance competition, under harsh criticism.

The following day afterward, Pancada is approached by his crush, Honey, who kisses him on the cheek, as she is impressed by his 'win'. He then, having won the dance competition the night before, erroneously believes that he is being congratulated for his dancing skills. However, a newspaper article arrives at the club, showing Pancada that he was mistaken for Polaris, and found no one was praising him for his dancing. After some words of wisdom from Master Jin, he approaches his boss in his office, attempting to blackmail him in order to enter the ring, wanting to rematch Freak Teddy to earn further praise. However, despite brief training, Pancada fights Freak Teddy, and loses badly.

After the fight, Pancada becomes a laughing stock again, and arrives to Polaris' office to inform him of the loss. However, Polaris informs Pancada that he had made a bet that the latter would lose the fight, and therefore, he becomes wealthy. He then hands ownership of the club to Pancada, leaving. Grizzlepuss, after finally putting two-and-two together, confronts Pancada about the scheme, though the panda simply denies this.

After Polaris retires to the icy mountains, Pancada transforms the boxing club into a dance club.

Cast

Production
The film was produced by animation studio Vídeo Brinquedo to coincide with the film Kung Fu Panda. The similarities that the film has with Kung Fu Panda have brought many to consider it a mockbuster, a characteristic associated with many of Vídeo Brinquedo's films. The film's animation was completed by Paulo Biagioni, Renato Fujie, Arturo Hernández, and its director, Michelle Gabriel.

Release and reception
The movie was released on DVD on November 18, 2008 and received generally negative reviews from critics, primarily because of its similarities to Kung Fu Panda, which was released only a few months before. A columnist for the website Nster News wrote that, in comparison to Kung Fu Panda, The Little Panda Fighter is "a trashy uninspired rip-off with a similar plot and lower budget". Mike Jeavons of Channel Awesome stated that "the animation is terrible, the dialogue physically hurts, and the story is contrived and barely feels complete enough to fill the 50-minute runtime. The music is bad, the whole thing lacks imagination, and the characters and their motivations are awful". On April 16, 2021, YouTuber Danny Gonzalez released a video titled, "The Kung Fu Panda Ripoff From Your Nightmares", in which he made jokes about and reviewed the movie.

References

External links

 
 

2008 films
2000s sports comedy films
2008 computer-animated films
2008 direct-to-video films
Animated films about bears
Brazilian animated films
Computer-animated films
Direct-to-video animated films
2000s Portuguese-language films
Mockbuster films
Animated comedy films
Animated action films
Animated sports films
Boxing animation
Brazilian boxing films
Films about giant pandas
Films about polar bears
Brazilian sports comedy films